452nd or 452d may refer to:

452d Air Mobility Wing, United States Air Force air mobility unit located at March ARB, California
452d Flight Test Squadron (452 FLTS), part of the 412th Test Wing, based at Edwards Air Force Base, California
452d Operations Group, the flying component of the 452d Air Mobility Wing, assigned to the United States Air Force Reserve
452d Strategic Fighter Squadron, inactive United States Air Force unit

See also
452 (number)
452, the year 452 (CDLII) of the Julian calendar
452 BC